James T. Sears (born August 12, 1951) is an American educator, historian, and activist.  He is a former professor at the University of South Carolina, Trinity University, Harvard University, and Penn State. The author of books about LGBT history and sexuality education, his archive of correspondence, research notes, interviews (totaling 138 linear feet in 317 boxes) is located at the Rubenstein Library of Duke University with ancillary materials at the College of Charleston Special Collections.

Early life
Sears was born on August 12, 1951, in Tipton, Indiana. He graduated from Southern Illinois University, where he earned a bachelor's degree majoring in history and government in 1974. He earned a master's degree in secondary education from Indiana University, followed by another master's degree in Political Science from the University of Wisconsin-Madison. His PhD, in 1984, from Indiana University was a critical ethnography of that same university, where he earned his doctorate in sociology and curriculum studies—and later named Outstanding IU Alumni.

Career
Sears began his career in higher education at Trinity University, in 1983, and then was appointed assistant professor at The University of South Carolina and was promoted to full professor in 1991. During his 20-year career at USC, Sears pursued twin writing tracks in sexuality education and LGBT studies establishing himself as "one of the preeminent scholars of southern gay culture" and earning the wrath of the Christian Right. In 1993, Southern Baptist Convention members joined other conservative religious groups across the country in condemning Sears for teaching a graduate course on the impact of Christian fundamentalism on education, earning him the moniker of "Satan of the University" and awarded South Carolina's American Civil Liberties Union First Amendment Award. In addition to organizing for LGBT rights on and off campus, Sears was the founding editor of two LGBT journals—Empathy (1988-1994) and the Journal of LGBT Youth (2003–present). He was also an early gay activist locally, co-founding the South Carolina Business Guild and giving a major gay rights speech on the steps of the capitol in 1993.

Sears was a visiting a visiting researcher at the University of Southern California,[1] a visiting research fellow at the University of Queensland, a Research Lecturer at Brazil's National Council for Scientific and Technological Development, and a Fulbright Southeast Asian Scholar.

Selected works

References

Living people
1951 births
People from Tipton, Indiana
Southern Illinois University alumni
Indiana University alumni
University of Wisconsin–Madison College of Letters and Science alumni
University of South Carolina faculty
20th-century American historians
American male non-fiction writers
LGBT historians
Historians from Indiana
20th-century American male writers